VoxTalk was TVOntario's "Youth Issues Talk Show." Created and Produced by Maria Farano until her departure, and subsequently produced by Alison Bruce, VoxTalk aimed to tackle a different youth-relevant issue every week. The show took place in a typical panel show format: each week, host Max Valiquette would interview a small group of teens or young adults about the topic in question.

The show appeared in TVOntario on Sunday nights in 2005 and 2006.

External links
 Official Website

2000s Canadian television talk shows
TVO original programming